The Carers (Equal Opportunities) Act 2004 (c 15) is an Act of the Parliament of the United Kingdom aimed at helping carers achieve fair access to training, work and leisure opportunities. It was introduced as a Private Member's Bill by Dr. Hywel Francis and sponsored in the House of Lords by Lord Ashley of Stoke. 5.2 million people in England and Wales identified themselves in the 2001 Census as providing unpaid care to support family members, friends, neighbours or others because of long-term physical or mental ill-health, disability or old age. That represented nearly 10 per cent of the population and of those, 21 per cent (1.09 million) provided care for 50 or more hours per week.

The Act requires assessments to be offered to carers, to consider the needs of carers in relation to leisure, education, training and work. Not all carers will wish to pursue all of these opportunities but practitioners completing assessments with the carer should be able to signpost carers to other relevant agencies.

Section 6 - Short title, commencement and extent
This section came into force on 22 July 2004.

The following orders have been made under section 6(2):
The Carers (Equal Opportunities) Act 2004 (Commencement) (England) Order 2005 (S.I. 2005/876 (C. 37))
The Carers (Equal Opportunities) Act 2004 (Commencement) (Wales) Order 2005 (S.I. 2005/1153 (W. 70) (C. 53))

Content
The Act
 places a duty on local authorities to tell carers about their rights,
 places a duty on local authorities to consider whether the carer works or wishes to work, wishes to study or have some leisure activities, when they are carrying out a carer's assessment,
 gives local authorities strong powers to enlist the help of health, housing and education authorities in providing support for carers.

References

External links

Explanatory notes to the Carers (Equal Opportunities) Act 2004.

United Kingdom Acts of Parliament 2004
Social care in England